Bruce Barnes may refer to:

Bruce Barnes (executive) (born 1962), American investment banker and business executive
Bruce Barnes (tennis) (1909–1990), American tennis player
Bruce Barnes (Left Behind), a fictional character in the Left Behind series
Bruce Barnes (American football) (born 1951), punter in the National Football League